Aayudham is a 1982 Indian Malayalam-language film, directed by P. Chandrakumar and produced by R. S. Prabhu. The film stars Madhu, K. R. Vijaya, Sukumaran and Thikkurissy Sukumaran Nair. The film has musical score by A. T. Ummer.The film is remake of 1977 Bollywood movie Adhalat .

Cast

Madhu as Sathyapalan
K. R. Vijaya as Susheela
M. G. Soman as Inspector Williams
Sukumaran as Rajan
K. P. Ummer as Vishwanathan
Sukumari as Saraswathi
Thikkurissy Sukumaran Nair as Barrister Rajashekharan Thambi
Sankaradi as Moosa
Menaka as Usha
Balan K. Nair as Prathapan
C. I. Paul as Thambi
Janardanan as Suresh
Kunchan as Kunchan, Phalgunan (double role)
Paravoor Bharathan as Menon
Poornima Jayaram as Sandhya
Sabitha Anand as Girl at oppana
Vallathol Unnikrishnan as Antony
Kundara Johnny as Johny
Pournami as Sainaba
P. R. Menon as Judge
 Prameela as Sainabha
 Thalavadi Devan
 Karunakaran
 Karatte Mani

Soundtrack
The music was composed by A. T. Ummer and the lyrics were written by Sathyan Anthikkad.

References

External links
 

1982 films
1980s Malayalam-language films
Films directed by P. Chandrakumar